Seneca College v Bhadauria, [1981] 2 SCR 181 is a leading decision of the Supreme Court of Canada on civil rights and tort law. The Court ruled that there can be no common law tort of discrimination.

Background
Bhadauria, an East Indian woman, was qualified to teach in Ontario and had seven years experience. She had applied ten times to Seneca College but was never granted an interview. Bhadauria claimed that she was not interviewed because of her ethnicity.

She argued that the college had violated the common law tort of discrimination. The Court of Appeal for Ontario accepted the existence of such a tort. Since Bhadauria could show that such a right existed and that it had been violated by the practices of the college she would be entitled to remedy.

Decision of the Supreme Court of Canada
The Court allowed the appeal. It held that there was no tort of discrimination in Canadian common law. The court reasoned that a tort of discrimination was unnecessary since Bhadauria already had access to the human rights regime.

External links
 full text of decision at CanLII

Canadian civil rights case law
Canadian tort case law
Supreme Court of Canada cases
1981 in Canadian case law
Seneca College
Minority rights
Employment discrimination